Fillie Lyckow (31 October 1934 – 27 March 2015) was a Swedish actress. She has acted in the films about Maggie (Madicken) and the Swedish TV series "Varuhuset" (The Department Store). In 2007/2008 she was the von Trapp maid, Frau Schmidt, in The Sound of Music at Göta Lejon. She died on 27 March 2015.

Filmography
 1961 - Lustgården - Berta
 1964 - The Dress - Butiksbiträde
 1973 - Luftburen - Marianne
 1974 - Straffet - Barnavårdsassistenten
 1977 - Mackan - Kenneths mor
 1978 - En och en - Malin
 1979 - Madicken - Fröken
 1979 - Du är inte klok Madicken - Fröken
 1980 - Flygnivå 450 - Sjuksköterska
 1980 - Madicken på Junibacken - Fröken
 1982 - Brusten Himmel - Ebba
 1984 - Sömnen - Alma
 1987 - Varuhuset - Aina Lindgren
 1988 - Kråsnålen - Fru Blomqvist
 1989 - Tre kärlekar (TV-serie, gästroll) - Fredrika Melin
 1994 - Svensson Svensson - Dagmar
 2000 - Nya tider - Liselotte Rosén
 2009 - Guldkungen
 2009 -  Livet i Fagervik

References

Fillie Lyckow at Svensk Filmdatabas

Fillie Lyckow at hollywood.premiere.com
 Fillie Lyckow  at The New York Times

External links

1934 births
2015 deaths
Swedish actresses